Weston James Earl McKennie (born August 28, 1998) is an American professional soccer  player who plays as a midfielder for Premier League club Leeds United, on loan from  club Juventus, and for the United States national team. A versatile player, McKennie is capable of playing in a multitude of positions in midfield—mainly as a box-to-box or as a deep-lying defensive midfielder.

Coming through the youth system, McKennie began his senior club career at Bundesliga side Schalke 04. In 2017–18, he established himself as a first team player, playing 25 games in all competitions. After three seasons, McKennie moved to Italian champions Juventus on loan, with the deal becoming permanent in March 2021. With Juventus he won the 2020 Supercoppa Italiana and the 2020–21 Coppa Italia.

McKennie has represented the United States internationally at both the youth and senior levels. He made his senior debut in 2017 and has finished runner-up in the 2019 CONCACAF Gold Cup and won the inaugural 2019-20 CONCACAF Nations League. Individually he won a U.S. Soccer Male Player of the Year award in 2020.

Early life
Although he was born at Fort Lewis, Washington, he considers Little Elm, Texas, his home town. McKennie lived in Kaiserslautern, Germany, from age six to nine as his father, a United States Air Force officer, was stationed at nearby Ramstein Air Base. McKennie started playing soccer for the local club FC Phönix Otterbach in 2004, before moving back to the United States. McKennie played for the youth system of Major League Soccer side FC Dallas for seven years from 2009 to 2016, before moving to Schalke. His transfer to Schalke was the main catalyst for FC Dallas to create their reserve team, North Texas SC, which played in USL League One.

In February 2016, McKennie signed a National Letter of Intent to play for the University of Virginia, but he subsequently turned down the scholarship offer to play for the Cavaliers, and instead sought to go professional.

Club career

Schalke 04

2016–2018

In July 2016 McKennie declined to sign a Homegrown Player contract with FC Dallas. He joined German Bundesliga side FC Schalke 04 in August 2016.

After spending less than a year with Schalke's academy team, McKennie was promoted to the first-team squad in May 2017. He made his professional debut on May 20, 2017, as a 77th-minute substitute during a 1–1 draw with FC Ingolstadt 04. This was his only appearance during the 2016–17 season. McKennie made his first start in September 2017 and signed a five-year contract shortly after. During the same year, McKennie made 21 appearances and scored 4 goals with Schalke's U-19 team.

During the 2017–18 season, McKennie cemented his place as a member of the Schalke first team at the age of 19. He made 22 appearances in the Bundesliga. He finished the 2017–18 season with 25 appearances in all competitions. Further, he proved to be a valuable asset to Schalke given his versatility, McKennie played in multiple positions in the midfield and defense of the team.

2018–19 season
During the 2018–19 season, McKennie further increased his position with the Bundesliga club, starting 25 games for the club in both the Bundesliga, DFB-Pokal, and UEFA Champions League. Overall, McKennie made 33 appearances for the club and scored 2 goals in all competitions, in which he scored his first Champions League goal in a 1–0 away win over Lokomotiv Moscow.

2019–20 season
Under new manager David Wagner, McKennie further established himself as an important part and valuable asset of a team that struggled to deal with the COVID-19 pandemic. McKennie made a total of 28 appearances and scored three goals for Schalke in the Bundesliga. McKennie made a further four appearances in the DFB-Pokal for the club.

On May 30, 2020, during a 1–0 loss to SV Werder Bremen, McKennie wore an armband that said “Justice for George” following the murder of George Floyd in the United States.

Juventus

2020–21 season 
On August 29, 2020, it was announced that McKennie joined Serie A side Juventus on a year-long loan. In doing so, he became Juventus' first player—and Serie A's fifth—from the United States. The move was structured as an initial year-long loan for a fee of €4.5 million, with an option to make the loan permanent at the end of the season. However, if McKennie meets certain performance incentives, the option will automatically trigger, and the deal will become permanent. In both scenarios, the deal will be for €18.5 million, which could rise an additional €7 million. On September 7, McKennie had his introductory press conference and was given the number 14.

McKennie made his league debut for Juventus on September 20, starting and playing the full 90 minutes in a 3–0 league home win against Sampdoria. McKennie made his Champions League debut for the club in the second match of the group stage, coming on in the 75th minute of a 2–0 home defeat to Barcelona. On November 1, McKennie got on the score sheet for the first time for Juventus, earning an assist on the opening goal by Álvaro Morata in a 4–1 win against Spezia. On November 24, McKennie started a Champions League match against Ferencváros, becoming the first American international in Italy to do so. McKennie scored his first goal for Juventus on December 5, in the Derby della Mole against Torino; he scored the equalizer of the match, which eventually ended in a 2–1 win. Three days later, McKennie scored his first Champions League goal for Juventus—a scissor kick on the volley—against Barcelona, helping his team win 3–0 away from home and finish in first place in their group. On January 6, 2021, McKennie scored a goal against league-leaders Milan in a 3–1 away win; it was Milan's first league defeat in 27 games.

On March 3, 2021, Juventus exercised their purchase option for €18.5 million, plus €6.5 million in potential bonuses, on a four-year contract. McKennie started for Juventus in the Coppa Italia Final against Atalanta; he assisted Dejan Kulusevski for the team's first goal in an eventual 2–1 win. McKennie finished the 2020–21 season with six goals in 46 appearances in all competitions.

2021–22 season 
McKennie scored his first goal of the season in a 2–1 loss to Sassuolo, and followed it up with a second goal in another 2–1 loss to Hellas Verona. On January 12, 2022, McKennie scored the opener in the 2021 Supercoppa Italiana match eventually lost 2–1 against Inter Milan. On February 22, in a Champions League game against Villarreal, McKennie injured his metatarsal following a foul by Pervis Estupiñán, forcing him to prematurely end his season.

2022-23 season
On 30 January 2023 McKennie joined Leeds United on loan for the remainder of the 2022-23 season. He made his Leeds debut on 5 February 2023 as a second-half substitute in the Premier League 1-0 defeat to Nottingham Forest.

International career

McKennie has played with various United States youth teams, including the under-17 and under-20 national teams. McKennie earned his first senior team callup for the United States' friendly against Portugal on November 14, 2017, scoring on his debut.

McKennie's first international assist came in the opening game of the 2019 CONCACAF Gold Cup against Guyana at Allianz Field in a 4–0 win. McKennie scored the lone goal for the U.S. on June 30, 2019, to help them secure a 1–0 win in the Gold Cup quarter-finals against Curaçao. McKennie notched his second goal in the semi-finals against Jamaica in the 19th minute.

On October 12, 2019, McKennie scored the fastest hat-trick in the U.S. men's national team's history, scoring three goals in thirteen minutes in a CONCACAF Nations League game against Cuba.

On June 6, 2021, McKennie scored a decisive 2–2 equalizer in the 2021 CONCACAF Nations League Final against rivals Mexico, bringing the game to extra time. The game ultimately ended 3–2 to the United States, and McKennie was nominated Player of the Tournament.

On September 7, 2021, during the final round of 2022 FIFA World Cup qualifying, McKennie was dropped from the national team for breaking COVID-19 team protocols by bringing a guest into his hotel room while the team was in Nashville, Tennessee, for their match against Canada. As a result, he missed the final two matches of the series.

Style of play 
McKennie is known for his versatility as a player. During his time at Schalke, McKennie played in numerous positions including in midfield, as a center-back, full-back, and even as a striker. However, he has primarily played as either a box-to-box midfielder or in a deeper-lying defensive role. During his time with Juventus, he has been used in several midfield positions, including as a wide midfielder, in a holding role, or even as a more offensive-minded central midfielder, known as the mezzala role in Italian soccer jargon.

McKennie's primary attributes are his defensive skills and work rate, as well as his ability to win back the ball. Furthermore, his passing allows him to dictate the flow of the game and push the ball forward from deep-lying positions in midfield. His ball-winning qualities, combined with his positioning, tactical intelligence, eye for goal from midfield, and ability to make late attacking runs into the box led Alberto Mauro of Il Messaggero to compare him to former Juventus midfielders Edgar Davids and Arturo Vidal; McKennie's technical ability was cited as an area in need of improvement, however.

Career statistics

Club

International

Scores and results list the United States' goal tally first, score column indicates score after each McKennie goal.

Honors 
Juventus
 Coppa Italia: 2020–21
 Supercoppa Italiana: 2020

United States
 CONCACAF Nations League: 2019–20
 CONCACAF Gold Cup runner-up: 2019

Individual
 U.S. Soccer Player of the Year: 2020
 CONCACAF Nations League Player of the Tournament: 2021

References

External links

 FC Dallas Profile
 Juventus Profile

1998 births
Living people
People from Fort Lewis, Washington
Soccer players from Washington (state)
African-American soccer players
American soccer players
Association football midfielders
FC Schalke 04 players
Juventus F.C. players
Leeds United F.C. players
Bundesliga players
Serie A players
Premier League players
United States men's youth international soccer players
United States men's under-20 international soccer players
United States men's international soccer players
2019 CONCACAF Gold Cup players
2022 FIFA World Cup players
American expatriate soccer players
American expatriate soccer players in Germany
American expatriate sportspeople in Italy
Expatriate footballers in Italy
American expatriate sportspeople in England
Expatriate footballers in England
21st-century African-American sportspeople